Simple Pleasures is the fourth studio album by American singer and musician Bobby McFerrin, released in 1988 by Manhattan Records. 

The album was McFerrin's commercial breakthrough and contained the hit single "Don't Worry, Be Happy". The song was featured in the film Cocktail and peaked at No. 1 for two weeks on the Billboard Hot 100. "Don't Worry, Be Happy" won the 1988 Grammy Awards for Song of the Year, Record of the Year, and Best Male Pop Vocal Performance.

Simple Pleasures spent 55 weeks on the Billboard 200 in the U.S., peaking at No. 5. On September 26, 1988, the album was certified Platinum by the Recording Industry Association of America.

The album features unaccompanied a cappella singing, with all parts performed exclusively by McFerrin via overdubbing.

Track listing

Personnel
Bobby McFerrin – all vocals

Technical
Linda Goldstein – co-producer
Bobby McFerrin – co-producer
Chris Tergesen – engineer
Gary Solomon – assistant engineer
Matthew La Monica – assistant engineer
Don Rodenbach – assistant engineer
Dave Luke – assistant engineer
Jack Skinner – mastering
Henry Marquez – art direction
Carol Friedman – photography

Charts

Weekly charts

Year-end charts

Certifications

References

1988 albums
Bobby McFerrin albums
EMI Records albums